The 2019 Copa do Nordeste was the 16th edition of the main football tournament featuring teams from the Brazilian Northeast Region. The competition featured 16 clubs, with Bahia, Ceará and Pernambuco having two seeds each, and Rio Grande do Norte, Sergipe, Alagoas, Paraíba, Maranhão and Piauí with one seed each. Four teams were decided by a qualifying tournament (Pré-Copa do Nordeste).

In the finals, Fortaleza defeated Botafogo-PB 2–0 on aggregate to win their first Copa do Nordeste title. As champions, Fortaleza qualified for the Round of 16 of the 2020 Copa do Brasil.

Sampaio Corrêa were the defending champions, but were eliminated in the group stage.

Format changes
In this season, 12 teams (9 state league champions and best placed teams in the 2018 CBF ranking from Bahia, Ceará and Pernambuco) gained direct entries into the group stage while the other four berths were decided by the Pré-Copa do Nordeste.

For the group stage, the 16 teams were drawn into two groups. Each team played once against the eight clubs from the other group. Top four teams qualified for the final stages. Quarter-finals and semi-finals were played on a single-leg basis and finals were played on a home-and-away two-legged basis.

Teams

2019 Pré-Copa do Nordeste
The 2019 Pré-Copa do Nordeste was the qualifying tournament of 2019 Copa do Nordeste. It was played from 18 April to 1 May 2018. Best placed team in the 2018 CBF ranking not already qualified from Alagoas, Bahia, Maranhão, Paraíba, Pernambuco, Piauí, Rio Grande do Norte and Sergipe competed to decide four places in the Copa do Nordeste.

Draw
The draw was held on 9 April 2018, 15:00, at the CBF headquarters in Rio de Janeiro. Teams were seeded by their 2018 CBF ranking (shown in parentheses). The eight teams were drawn into four ties, with the Pot A teams hosting the second leg.

Each tie was played on a home-and-away two-legged basis. If tied on aggregate, the away goals rule would not be used, extra time would not be played, and the penalty shoot-out would be used to determine the winner (Regulations Pré-Copa do Nordeste Article 9).

Matches

|}

Sampaio Corrêa, Confiança, Salgueiro and CRB qualified for 2019 Copa do Nordeste.

Qualified teams

Schedule
The schedule of the competition was as follows.

Draw
The draw for the group stage was held on 4 October 2018, 20:00, at Teatro Gustavo Leite in Maceió. The 16 teams were drawn into two groups of eight containing two teams from each of the four pots with the restriction that teams from the same federation (except Salgueiro) could not be drawn into the same group. Teams were seeded by their 2018 CBF ranking (shown in parentheses).

A second draw to determine the home-and-away teams for matches between same-state clubs was held on 15 October 2018 at CBF headquarters in Rio de Janeiro.

Group stage
For the group stage, the 16 teams were drawn into two groups of eight teams each. Each team played on a single round-robin tournament against the eight clubs from the other group. The top four teams of each group advanced to the quarter-finals of the knockout stages. The teams were ranked according to points (3 points for a win, 1 point for a draw, and 0 points for a loss). If tied on points, the following criteria would be used to determine the ranking: 1. Wins; 2. Goal difference; 3. Goals scored; 4. Fewest red cards; 5. Fewest yellow cards; 6. Draw in the headquarters of the Brazilian Football Confederation (Regulations Article 10).

Group A

Group B

Results

Final stages
Starting from the quarter-finals, the teams played a single-elimination tournament with the following rules:
Quarter-finals and semi-finals were played on a single-leg basis, with the higher-seeded team hosting the leg.
 If tied, the penalty shoot-out would be used to determine the winner (Regulations Article 11).
Finals were played on a home-and-away two-legged basis, with the higher-seeded team hosting the second leg.
 If tied on aggregate, the penalty shoot-out would be used to determine the winner (Regulations Article 12).
Extra time would be not played and away goals rule would be not used in final stages.

Starting from the semi-finals, the teams were seeded according to their performance in the tournament. The teams were ranked according to overall points. If tied on overall points, the following criteria would be used to determine the ranking: 1. Overall wins; 2. Overall goal difference; 3. Draw in the headquarters of the Brazilian Football Confederation (Regulations Article 17).

Bracket

Quarter-finals

|}

Matches

Semi-finals

|}

Matches

Finals

|}

Matches

Top goalscorers

2019 Copa do Nordeste team
The 2019 Copa do Nordeste team was a squad consisting of the eleven most impressive players at the tournament.

||

Awards
Before the 2020 Copa do Nordeste draw, the following players were rewarded for their performances during the 2019 competition.

Best player: Edinho (Fortaleza)
Best goalkeeper: Marcelo Boeck (Fortaleza)
Topscorer: Gilberto (Bahia) and Júnior Santos (Fortaleza)

References

2019 domestic association football cups
Copa do Nordeste
2019 in Brazilian football